Flynn Appleby (born 21 January 1999) is an American college football punter with the Rutgers Scarlet Knights and a former professional Australian rules footballer who played for Collingwood in the Australian Football League.

State football
As a junior, Appleby played for local club Cohuna Kangas. In 2014 he moved to Ballarat, playing junior football in the Ballarat Football League with Ballarat in 2015 and with North Ballarat City in 2016. He also played with the Greater Western Victoria Rebels in the TAC Cup, being named among the best players 12 times in the 18 matches he played, as well as playing one Victorian Football League (VFL) game with North Ballarat. He tested at the Rookie Me Combine in October 2017, then trained with Collingwood's affiliate in the VFL. Due to this, Collingwood were fined $20,000, since players are not allowed to train with an AFL club or state-league counterpart if they attend a combine, with half of the fine being suspended until 31 October 2018.

AFL career
Appleby was drafted by Collingwood with the sixth pick of the 2018 rookie draft, which was their first selection. He made his debut in round 6 of the 2018 season against Richmond at the Melbourne Cricket Ground, as a late replacement for Tom Langdon. During the COVID-19 pandemic, Appleby returned to his parents' dairy farm in Cohuna, helping out with the farm-work while training four times a week at the Cohuna Football Oval with Melbourne player Marty Hore, whose family has a dairy farm near in Leitchville.
In November 2020, Appleby was delisted by Collingwood. Appleby was unsuccessful in his attempt to regain a spot on an AFL club's list, though was appointed as captain of the North Melbourne reserves ahead of the 2021 VFL season.

He is now signed with the Rutgers Scarlet Knights Football Team.

Personal life
Appleby grew up in Cohuna, Victoria and is the cousin of golfer Stuart Appleby. His parents, Graham and Megan, own a dairy farm in Cohuna. After moving to Ballarat, Appleby studied and boarded at Ballarat Clarendon College.

Statistics
Statistics are correct to the end of the 2020 season

|- style="background-color: #eaeaea"
! scope="row" style="text-align:center" | 2018
|
| 31 || 9 || 0 || 1 || 72 || 37 || 109 || 36 || 12 || 0.0 || 0.1 || 8.0 || 4.1 || 12.1 || 4.0 || 1.3
|- 
! scope="row" style="text-align:center" | 2019
|
| 31 || 1 || 0 || 0 || 3 || 4 || 7 || 2 || 1 || 0.0 || 0.0 || 3.0 || 4.0 || 7.0 || 2.0 || 1.0
|- style="background-color: #eaeaea"
! scope="row" style="text-align:center" | 2020
|
| 31 || 1 || 1 || 2 || 4 || 5 || 9 || 1 || 2 || 1.0 || 2.0 || 4.0 || 5.0 || 9.0 || 1.0 || 2.0
|- class="sortbottom"
! colspan=3| Career
! 11
! 1
! 3
! 79
! 46
! 125
! 39
! 15
! 0.1
! 0.3
! 7.2
! 4.2
! 11.4
! 3.5
! 1.4
|}

References

External links 
 
 

Collingwood Football Club players
North Ballarat Football Club players
Living people
1999 births
Australian rules footballers from Victoria (Australia)